Middle Man is the ninth studio album by Boz Scaggs released by Columbia Records in 1980. Scaggs hired members of the band Toto as session musicians and shared songwriting credits with them, returning to the commercial, soul-influenced rock of Silk Degrees (1976).

The album reached No. 8 in the Billboard 200 album chart, and two singles reached the Billboard Hot 100: "Breakdown Dead Ahead" at No. 15 and "Jojo" at No. 17.

Reception

Writing for Smash Hits in 1980, David Hepworth described Middle Man as an "impeccably tasteful collection of sophisticated white soul" that was "useful as background music in the more sedate kind of nite spot". Acknowledging that the album was "well done", Hepworth noted that Scaggs' previous albums were "thrilling as well as perfectly formed". Hepworth went on to say that the album sounded as though "they designed the sleeve first and then made the record to go in it". Interestingly, two cuts from the album, "Jojo" and "Breakdown Dead Ahead", landed higher on the Canadian charts than on another international or US charts, indicating that Canadian audiences had embraced Scaggs' harder rock edge, diverging from slower ballads and hits such as "Look What You've Done To Me", which he deftly wrote in the same year, as a track for the movie, Urban Cowboy.

Allmusic's retrospective review commented that the album "caps off the decade with equal nods to [Scaggs's] '70s hitmaking formulas and the newer, shinier production techniques of the coming decade." They made a point of noting the album's repeated imitation of then-popular fads, while at the same time, opining that these imitations were successful.

Track listing
All songs written by David Foster and Boz Scaggs, except where noted.

Personnel 

 Boz Scaggs – lead vocals, guitar (1–8)
 David Foster – synthesizers (1, 3, 5, 7–9), acoustic piano (1–5, 7), string arrangements (1, 3–5, 8), electric piano (3, 4, 8), synthesizer programming
 Don Grolnick – electric piano (2), acoustic piano (8)
 David Paich – additional synthesizer (3), organ (6), synthesizers (6)
 James Newton Howard – clavinet (6)
 Michael Boddicker – synthesizer programming
 Larry Fast – synthesizer programming
 Steve Porcaro – synthesizer programming
 Ray Parker Jr. – guitar (1–8), bass (6)
 Steve Lukather – lead guitars (1, 3, 5–8), additional guitars (2), guitar solo (2, 7, 8), all guitars (9)
 Carlos Santana – guitar solo (4)
 John Pierce – bass (1)
 David Hungate – bass (2–5, 7–9)
 Jeff Porcaro – drums (1, 3–5, 7, 9)
 Rick Marotta – drums (2, 8)
 Joe Vitale – drums (6)
 Lenny Castro – percussion
 Adrian Tapia – saxophone solo (1)
 Marty Paich – string arrangements (4)
 Charlotte Crossley – backing vocals (1)
 David Lasley – backing vocals (1, 6)
 Sharon Redd – backing vocals (1)
 Paulette Brown – backing vocals (2, 3, 5, 8, 9)
 Venetta Fields – backing vocals (2, 3, 5, 8, 9)
 Bill Thedford – backing vocals (2, 3, 8)
 Julia Tillman Waters – backing vocals (5, 9)
 Oren Waters – backing vocals (5, 9)
 Bill Champlin – backing vocals (6)
 Chuck "Fingers" Irwin – backing vocals (6)
 Rosemary Butler – backing vocals (7, 8)

Production 
 Producer and Engineer – Bill Schnee
 Assistant Engineers – Stephen Marcussen and Gabe Veltri
 Mastered by Doug Sax and Mike Reese at The Mastering Lab (Los Angeles, CA).
 Design – Nancy Donald
 Photography – Guy Bourdin
 Management – Irving Azoff

Charts

Weekly Charts

Year-end charts

References

External links
 Middle Man Lyrics

Boz Scaggs albums
1980 albums
Columbia Records albums
Albums recorded at Sunset Sound Recorders
Albums produced by Bill Schnee